Ferhadija Mosque, also known as Ferhat Pasha Mosque, is a central building in the city of Sarajevo built by Bosnian Sanjak-bey (governor)  Ferhad-beg Vuković, a descendant of the famous mediaeval  Vuković family. This mosque has one dome above the prayer area and three small domes at the cloister and is one of the greatest achievements of Bosnia and Herzegovina’s 16th century Ottoman and Islamic architecture.

The Ferhadija mosque reflects the full maturity of the classical Ottoman style-domed mosque, portico with small domes, and beautiful built-on minaret.

Research works on the painted decoration inside the mosque carried out in 1964–1965 revealed five painted layers dating from various periods.
The oldest and extremely valuable decorations of the first layer date from the 16th century (in the dome, on the cornice and pendentives, the base of the corner calottes, the mihrab and the lunettes of the lower row of windows), belonging to the group known as Rumi ornament, which were also to be seen in the Aladža Mosque in Foča.
 
The next layers (on the calottes, central part of the mihrab, and surface of the dome) consists of purely floral decorations with the features of 18th-century style.
The third and fourth layers date from the late 19th century (1878), and the first quarter of the 20th.

The mosque was damaged during the Bosnian War in 1992–1995.

See also
Islamic architecture
Islamic art
List of mosques in Europe

References

External links

 Ferhadija Mosque - Sarajevo

Ottoman mosques in Bosnia and Herzegovina
Mosques in Bosnia and Herzegovina
Mosques in Sarajevo
16th-century mosques
National Monuments of Bosnia and Herzegovina
Destroyed mosques
Rebuilt buildings and structures in Bosnia and Herzegovina
Attacks on religious buildings and structures during the Bosnian War
Medieval Bosnia and Herzegovina architecture
Baščaršija